Ülejõe is a village in Rapla Parish, Rapla County in northwestern Estonia.

The village lies roughly 45 mi (or 73 km) South-East of Tallinn, the Estonian capital.

References

 

Villages in Rapla County